Thomas Millington (fl. 1591–1603) was a London publisher of the Elizabethan era, who published first editions of three Shakespearean plays. He has been called a "stationer of dubious reputation" who was connected with some of the "bad quartos" and questionable texts of Shakespearean bibliography.

Life and work
He was the son of a William Millington, a "husbandman" of Hamptongay, Oxfordshire, and was apprenticed to a Henry Carre for a period of eight years, beginning on St. Bartholomew's Day (24 August) in 1583. Thomas Millington became a "freeman" (full member) of the Stationers Company on 8 November 1591. For a time he was in partnership with fellow guild member Edward White; their shop was located, and their title pages specify, "at the little north door of Paul's at the sign of the Gun."

Millington's business was at the lower end of the publishing scale in Elizabethan England; he printed many ballads, including some by Thomas Deloney. In 1595 he published The Norfolk Tragedy, a ballad based on the story of Babes in the Wood. During the mid-1590s Millington was fined three times by his guild, for issuing ballads to which he did not own the rights and similar small offenses.

Shakespeare
He also printed playbooks — most notably, of three of Shakespeare's plays:
 On 12 March 1594, Millington entered into the Stationers' Register the early alternative version of Shakespeare's Henry VI, Part 2, short-titled The First Part of the Contention Betwixt the Two Famous Houses of York and Lancaster (the full title is much longer). He published the play in quarto later that year, in a text that is generally classed as a bad quarto. The printing was done by Thomas Creede.
 In 1595, with no Register entry, Millington published the early alternative version of Henry VI, Part 3, called The True Tragedy of Richard Duke of York — another "bad quarto." The printing was by "P. S." (The play should not be confused with The True Tragedy of Richard III, a separate work.)
 In 1600, in partnership with stationer John Busby, Millington published the first quarto of Henry V, yet another bad quarto, again printed by Creede. Millington did not enter the play into the Stationers' Register, though an entry dated 4 August 1600 cites the play and notes it is "to be stayed." This apparently was an attempt by some party, perhaps the Lord Chamberlain's Men or their representative, to prevent the publication of Henry V. If so, the attempt was clearly unsuccessful; and another Register entry dated ten days later, on 14 August, transfers the rights to the play to stationer Thomas Pavier.

Millington published the second quartos of both The First Part of the Contention and The True Tragedy in 1600. And he had a link to one other Shakespearean play: when John Danter published Q1 of Titus Andronicus in 1594, the volume's title page states the book would be sold at Millington and White's shop in St. Paul's Churchyard. In a Stationers' Register entry of 19 April 1602, Millington transferred his rights to the two Henry VI plays and Titus to Pavier, the same man who gained the rights to Henry V two years earlier.

End
Thomas Millington published Henry Chettle's England's Mourning Garment in 1603, but then disappears from the historical record — as did fellow publisher Andrew Wise in the same year. The major outbreak of bubonic plague in London in 1603 might not have been coincidental; printer Peter Short died in 1603, while publisher William Ponsonby passed on in 1604.

References

Publishers (people) from London
Year of birth unknown
Year of death unknown